Sangat Singh Gilzian (15 February 1953) is an Indian politician and a member of INC. In 2017, he was elected as the member of the Punjab Legislative Assembly from Urmar.

Constituency
He won the Urmar Assembly Constituency on an INC ticket, he beat the member of the Punjab Legislative Assembly Arbinder Singh Rasulpur of the Shiromani Akali Dal by over 14954 votes. Currently, he is Labour Minister in Punjab Government headed by Chief Minister Charanjit Singh Channi.

References

He is now cabnit minister punjab

Living people
Indian politicians
1953 births